Route 15 is a national route of Uruguay. It crosses the Rocha Department from the city of La Paloma in the south, to the town of Cebollatí in the north.

By law 13505 of 4 October 1966, this route was designated by the name of Javier Barrios Amorín, in the section between the city of La Paloma and Route 9.

References

Roads in Uruguay